Claudine is a Gladys Knight & the Pips album, written and produced by Curtis Mayfield. The disc is the soundtrack album for the 1974 20th Century Fox motion picture Claudine, starring James Earl Jones and Diahann Carroll.  The album was released in March 1974 on the Buddah label.

The first single release, "On and On", reached #2 on the R&B chart and #5 on the Billboard Hot 100 chart.  A second single, "Make Yours a Happy Home", was released two years later in 1976 and was a moderate hit, peaking at #13 R&B and #35 on the UK Singles Chart.  The album also included one instrumental, "Claudine Theme".  The album was also their third of five R&B albums chart-toppers.  Also included is a cover of Mayfield's "The Makings of You".

Track listing

Personnel
Rich Tufo – arranger
Roger Anfinsen – engineer
Milton Sincoff – creative packaging director
 Joseph "Lucky" Scott - bass
Curtis Mayfield, Phil Upchurch - guitars
Quentin Joseph - drums
Henry Gibson - congas
Rich Tufo - keyboards, organ.

Charts

Singles

See also
List of number-one R&B albums of 1974 (U.S.)

References

External links
Claudine at Discogs
How Curtis Mayfield and Gladys Knight Created a Sound for Working-Class Black America an essay by Mark Anthony Neal at the Criterion Collection

Gladys Knight & the Pips albums
Curtis Mayfield soundtracks
1974 soundtrack albums
Albums produced by Curtis Mayfield
Buddah Records soundtracks
Romance film soundtracks
Drama film soundtracks
Comedy film soundtracks